Ken Taylor (born 10 November 1953) is a New Zealand former cricketer. He played in one first-class and two List A matches for Canterbury from 1983 to 1985.

See also
 List of Canterbury representative cricketers

References

External links
 

1953 births
Living people
New Zealand cricketers
Canterbury cricketers
People from Lincoln, New Zealand
Cricketers from Canterbury, New Zealand